Yoo Eun-mi (born March 9, 2004) is a South Korean actress. She began her career as a child actress in television dramas such as Jang Bo-ri is Here! (2013) and the film The Fatal Encounter (2014).

Filmography

Television series

Film

References

External links 
 Yoo Eun-mi at IK Entertainment 
 
 

2004 births
Living people
21st-century South Korean actresses
South Korean child actresses
South Korean television actresses
South Korean film actresses